The Mobilier National is a French national service agency under the supervision of the French Ministry of Culture. It administers the Gobelins Manufactory and Beauvais Manufactory.

Its history goes back to the Garde-Meuble de la Couronne, which was responsible for the administration of all furniture and objects in the royal residences. The Mobilier National continues to administer state furniture but has also expanded from its historical role of conserving furniture to curating a modern collection.

The agency is based in the 13th arrondissement of Paris.

See also 
 Imperial Furniture Collection

External links 

 Official webpage

13th arrondissement of Paris
Government ministries of France